Rafiq Ansari (born 5 November 1962) is an Indian politician affiliated with the Samajwadi Party (SP). He is a Member of Legislative Assembly (MLA) from Meerut (Assembly constituency) of Uttar Pradesh.

References 

1962 births
Living people
Politicians from Meerut
Samajwadi Party politicians from Uttar Pradesh